Daniel James Roebuck (born March 4, 1963) is an American actor and writer. His best known roles include Deputy Marshal Robert Biggs in The Fugitive and its spinoff film U.S. Marshals, Jay Leno in The Late Shift, and Dr. Leslie Arzt in Lost, as well as numerous Rob Zombie and Don Coscarelli films. He is also known for his role as Cliff Lewis, Ben Matlock's private investigator, on Matlock from 1992 until 1995.

Life and career
Roebuck was born in Bethlehem, Pennsylvania, in 1963, and graduated from Bethlehem Catholic High School in Bethlehem in 1981.

He appeared in his first film role in 1985, the lead in Cavegirl. From 1992 to 1995, he played Andy Griffith's assistant lawyer and penultimate private investigator, Cliff Lewis, on the television drama Matlock, and he also had a recurring role as a corrupt officer, Insp. Rick Bettina, in Nash Bridges. He has appeared in numerous other guest roles in television programs and in many feature films including Bryan Loves You, River's Edge, and Dudes. He also played the role of US Marshal Bob Biggs in The Fugitive and U.S. Marshals. He played the part of Mr. Banks in the film Agent Cody Banks and its sequel. He has also appeared as the FBI Agent Weine in Final Destination.

In 1999, Roebuck guest starred in The King of Queens episode "Court Date", as Jeffrey the cop, whom lead character Carrie Heffernan tried to date in order to get out of a traffic ticket.

One of Roebuck's more memorable roles was as Jay Leno in the 1996 HBO made-for-TV film The Late Shift. Leno has often commented positively on Roebuck's performance whenever a guest would bring up the film on The Tonight Show with Jay Leno.  In 2001, he played a petty officer in the made-for-TV film A Glimpse of Hell exploring the 1989 USS Iowa battleship explosion.  In 2002, he played a hearse driver in the comedy horror film Bubba Ho-Tep, then acted in the 2006 production Red Riding Hood.

From 2005 until 2010, he had a recurring role in the television drama Lost, appearing as Dr. Arzt in nine episodes. Roebuck is a regular player in films by Rob Zombie, starting with The Devil's Rejects (2005), as Morris Green. He has been a writer and producer for the Monsterama series, appearing in some of the episodes. Roebuck also starred in the Disney Channel Original Movie Quints (2000), as well as the Nickelodeon original film, Shredderman Rules (2007). In the series Sonny with a Chance, he played Mr. Condor. He guest starred in Disney's Wizards of Waverly Place. In 2009, Roebuck guest starred in the fan-produced web series Star Trek: The Continuing Mission.

He has guest starred on one episode each of Dark Blue and Bones. He reprised his role of the Rob Zombie character Morris Green, providing that voice in the animated film The Haunted World of El Superbeasto (2009), and starred in the film, A Fork in the Road (2009).

Roebuck portrayed Dave Karofsky's father in the TV series Glee’s second season episodes "Furt" and "Born This Way", with a brief cameo appearance in the next season's "On My Way".

He played the role of Jim Nichol in the 2011 movie That's What I Am.

In October 2012, he played B.J. in AMC's The Walking Dead Cold Storage webisodes. He stars as Pastor Victor in the Rob Zombie film 31. In November 2015, he played Arnold Walker in The Man in the High Castle. His role, Arnold Walker, is the father of the leading character. He appeared in five of ten episodes in the first season, distributed through Amazon.com.

, he is host of "Classic with Daniel Roebuck" on New Evangelization Television in the New York metropolitan area. Also in 2022, he was cast to play the part of Grandpa The Count in the 2022 Rob Zombie reboot film, The Munsters.

Filmography

Film

Television

Web series

Video games

References

External links

 
 

1963 births
Living people
20th-century American male actors
21st-century American male actors
American male film actors
American male television actors
Bethlehem Catholic High School alumni
Male actors from Pennsylvania
Writers from Bethlehem, Pennsylvania